The Three Horseshoes is a Grade II listed public house at 11 Leicester Road, Whitwick, Leicestershire LE67 5GN.

It is on the Campaign for Real Ale's National Inventory of Historic Pub Interiors.

It was originally two cottages built in the early/mid 19th century, converted and extended with a front range to create pub in 1882.

References

Grade II listed pubs in Leicestershire
National Inventory Pubs